Daniel Wadsworth (1771–1848) of Hartford, Connecticut, was an American amateur artist and architect, arts patron and traveler.  He is most remembered as the founder of the Wadsworth Atheneum Museum of Art in his native city.

Early life and education
Daniel Wadsworth was descended from some of the first Puritan settlers of the Connecticut colony. His father Jeremiah Wadsworth was one of the wealthiest men in Hartford, and his mother Mehithabel Russell Wadsworth (1734-1817) was also from an elite family. The senior Wadsworth was involved in trade, manufacturing, banking, and insurance.

Young Daniel was educated partly at home; he was introduced to the great art and architecture of the royal courts of Europe by his father, who traveled there with him (see Grand tour).

Marriage and family
Wadsworth married Faith Trumbull in 1794. He later became acquainted with her uncle, John Trumbull, one of the period's most celebrated historical painters.

Career
Wadsworth was an accomplished amateur artist and architect. He took many trips with writer Benjamin Silliman and Trumbull to Niagara Falls and the White Mountains (New Hampshire) to write accounts and sketch the landscapes they saw.

In later years, he became a patron of painters like Thomas Cole and advised him and others on itineraries for their own sketching expeditions. He played a formative role in the life and work of a fellow son of Hartford, Frederic Edwin Church, whose prodigious talent Wadsworth was among the first to recognize. A letter of introduction to Cole vouched for the astonishing natural ability of this young man and secured him the chance to live and study with Cole. This launched Church on a meteoric career that would see him become the most famous and financially successful artist in America.

Determined to promote American artists, Wadsworth purchased the entire collection of the American Academy of the Fine Arts in New York. He then announced his plans to build "a Gallery of Fine Arts" on Main Street in Hartford, which would later be named after him as the Wadsworth Antheneum. He provided many of the art objects initially displayed from his personal collection in addition to the ones from the American Academy. He also helped poet Lydia Sigourney with the publication of her first books.

References

External links
Daniel Wadsworth and the Hudson River School, Hog River, Vol.3 No.1
The Wadsworth Atheneum Museum, homepage of official website

American art collectors
American artists
1771 births
1848 deaths